Cyprinodon brontotheroides is a species of pupfish in the genus Cyprinodon.

Distribution and habitat
It is endemic to hypersaline interior lakes on San Salvador Island, Bahamas.

Ecology and taxonomy
It coexists alongside two other closely related Cyprinodon species C. desquamator and C. variegatus. Together, these three species represent a recent adaptive radiation, each having moved into a difference niche within their specialized environment. Each of these species are defined by distinct trophic adaptations that have affected various aspects of functional morphology.

Description
Cyprinodon brontotheroides is durophagous. It has a large in-lever to out-lever ratio for closing its lower jaw with force and a protruding, reinforced nasal region probably used for crushing its specialized diet of ostracods and gastropods. They breed in the spring and the breeding territories are guarded by the males.

References

brontotheroides
Taxa named by Christopher H. Martin (zoologist)
Taxa named by Peter C. Wainwright
Fish described in 2013
Endemic fauna of the Bahamas